The constant chord theorem is a statement in elementary geometry about a property of certain chords in two intersecting circles.

A similar theorem exists in three dimensions for the intersection of two spheres. The spheres  and  intersect in the circle .  is arbitrary point on the surface of the first sphere , that is not on the intersection circle .

Nathan Altshiller Court described the constant chord theorem 1925 in the article sur deux cercles secants for the Belgian math journal Mathesis. Eight years later he published  On Two Intersecting Spheres in the American Mathematical Monthly, which contained the 3-dimensional version. Later it was included in several textbooks, such as Ross Honsberger's Mathematical Morsels and Roger B. Nelsen's Proof Without Words II, where it was given as a problem, or the German geometry textbook Mit harmonischen Verhältnissen zu Kegelschnitten by Halbeisen, Hungerbühler and Läuchli, where it was given as a theorem.

References 
Lorenz Halbeisen, Norbert Hungerbühler, Juan Läuchli: Mit harmonischen Verhältnissen zu Kegelschnitten: Perlen der klassischen Geometrie. Springer 2016, p. 16 (German)
Roger B. Nelsen: Proof Without Words II. MAA, 2000, p. 29
Ross Honsberger: Mathematical Morsels. MAA, 1979, pp. 126–127
Nathan Altshiller Court: On Two Intersecting Spheres. The American Mathematical Monthly, Band 40, Nr. 5, 1933, pp. 265–269 (JSTOR)
Nathan Altshiller-Court: sur deux cercles secants. Mathesis, Band 39, 1925, p. 453 (French)

External links 

constant chord theorem as problem at cut-the-knot.org 

Theorems about circles
Euclidean geometry